Fun flyer, Funflyer or Fun Flyer can refer to:
Blue Yonder EZ Fun Flyer, a Canadian ultralight aircraft
Ikarus Funflyer, a German hang glider